Wayne L. Hubbell (born 24 March 1943) is an American biochemist and member of the National Academy of Sciences.  He is Professor of Biochemistry and Jules Stein Professor of Ophthalmology at the University of California, Los Angeles.  His research focuses on the visual system, and is primarily supported by a grant from the National Eye Institute.

Research

Dr. Hubbell has studied the relationship between the molecular structure of protein and the conformational changes that control its function. Of particular interest are membrane proteins that behave as "molecular switches", i.e., proteins whose structures are switched to an active state by a physical or chemical signals. An example is light-activated rhodopsin, the visual pigment in photoreceptor cells of the retina. The goal is to elucidate the structure of rhodopsin, the mechanism of the molecular switch, and regulation of this switch by associated proteins, transducin and arrestin.

Dr. Hubbell's research also includes structure and function relationships in water-soluble proteins such as the lens protein, a-crystallin, and the retinoid carrying proteins which transport vitamin A throughout photoreceptor cells.

Dr. Hubbell's laboratory developed site-directed spin labeling (SDSL), a technique for the exploration of protein structure and dynamics. By changing the genetic code, a specific attachment point in the protein is created for a nitroxide spin label probe. Analysis of the electron paramagnetic resonance (EPR) spectrum of the spin label provides information about the local environment in the protein. With a sufficiently large set of labeled proteins, global information on structure is obtained, and most importantly, changes in the structure during function can be followed in real time.

Education and training
BS, Oregon State University, 1965
Ph.D., Stanford University, 1970
AFORSR-NRC Postdoctoral Fellow, Chemistry, Stanford University

Awards and honors
Westinghouse Science Talent Search Finalist, 1961
Alfred P. Sloan Foundation Fellow, 1973
Camille and Henry Dreyfus Foundation Teacher-Scholar Award, 1975–80
Research to Prevent Blindness Senior Investigator Award, 1990
National Institutes of Health MERIT Award, 1990
Biophysical Society's Elisabeth Roberts Cole Award, 1991
Alcon Research Institute Award, 1994
Alexander M. Cruickshank Lecturer, 1997
Honorary degree, University of Pécs, Hungary, 1998
Fellow of the Biophysical Society, 2000 (first class)
Gold Medal, International EPR Society, 2000
International Zavoisky Award in EPR, 2003
Fellow, American Academy of Arts and Sciences, 2001
Bruker Prize, Royal Society of Chemistry-ESR Group, 2004
Member of the National Academy of Sciences, 2005
Christian B. Anfinsen Award, 2009

References

External links
Hubbell Lab homepage

American biochemists
Members of the United States National Academy of Sciences
1943 births
Living people
Oregon State University alumni
University of California, Los Angeles faculty